Viola kauaensis is a rare species of flowering plant in the violet family known by the common names Kauai violet and pohe hiwa. It is endemic to Hawaii, where it is known from Kauai and Oahu.

This plant grows in bogs on Kauai and wet mountain habitat in the Koʻolau Range on Oahu.

There are three varieties of this plant. Viola kauaensis var. kauaensis is distributed in bogs and cloud forests in northwestern Kauai. Viola kauaensis var wahiawaensis (nani wai`ale`ale) is distributed on Kauai. In 2003 there were two populations totalling only 13 individuals. Viola kauaensis var. hosakae is a rare variety on Oahu.

References

External links

kauaensis
Endemic flora of Hawaii